William Ben Cassel (born September 20, 1955) is a judge of the Nebraska Supreme Court, representing Nebraska's Third Judicial District.

Cassel was appointed to the court on April 26, 2012 by Nebraska Governor Dave Heineman, filling a position made vacant by the appointment of John M. Gerrard to the United States District Court for the District of Nebraska. Prior to his appointment, Cassel was in private practice in Ainsworth, Nebraska from 1979 to 1992, worked for twelve years as a district judge, and served on the Nebraska Court of Appeals from 2004 to 2012. He is a fellow of the Nebraska State Bar Foundation  and of the American Bar Foundation.

He received his Bachelor of Science from the University of Nebraska in 1977, earning him the distinction of Order of the Coif  and his Juris Doctor cum laude from University of Nebraska College of Law in 1979.

References

1955 births
Living people
20th-century American lawyers
21st-century American judges
Nebraska lawyers
Justices of the Nebraska Supreme Court
People from Brown County, Nebraska
University of Nebraska–Lincoln alumni